Oliver Schröder (born 11 June 1980 in West Berlin, West Germany) is a retired German footballer, currently serving as assistant coach for the under-16 team of Hertha BSC.

Career statistics

1.Includes German Cup.
2.Includes UEFA Cup.
3.Includes German League Cup.

References

External links
 Player profile at fc-hansa.de 

1980 births
Living people
German footballers
Hertha BSC II players
1. FC Köln II players
1. FC Köln players
Hertha BSC players
VfL Bochum players
FC Hansa Rostock players
FC Erzgebirge Aue players
SC Fortuna Köln players
Bundesliga players
2. Bundesliga players
3. Liga players
Regionalliga players
Footballers from Berlin
Association football defenders